Raad may refer to:

Military
 Hatf-VIII (Ra'ad), air-launched Pakistani cruise missile
 RAAD (anti-tank guided missile), family of Iranian anti-tank missiles
 Raad (air defense system), Iranian air defense system
 Raad (anti-ship missile), Iranian anti-ship cruise missile
 Iranian Self-propelled howitzers
 Raad-1
 Raad-2

Other uses
 Raad ny Foillan, coastal long-distance footpath in the Isle of Man
 Republican Action Against Drugs, former vigilante group that operated in Northern Ireland
 Raad (name), list of people with the name